Dr. Heinz Doofenshmirtz, also known as Professor Time, is a fictional character from the American animated television series Phineas and Ferb. He was created by Dan Povenmire and Jeff "Swampy" Marsh, and is voiced by Povenmire. He was originally depicted as an incompetent and forgetful evil scientist intent on conquering the "entire Tri-State Area" by creating obscure but nefarious inventions, despite not technically being a true villain; Doofenshmirtz is shown to have a good side on some occasions. By the end of the series, the character is redeemed, using his inventions for the good of the world and looking after his daughter Vanessa. Dr. Doofenshmirtz speaks with a caricature of a German accent and is from the fictional European country Drusselstein.

Doofenshmirtz appears in several merchandise pieces, including a book series and a video game. He later made an appearance in the Milo Murphy's Law season one episode "Fungus Among Us". Following his house being destroyed in the second season premiere, he begins to live in the Murphys' house, and subsequently becomes a major supporting character throughout the rest of the series.

Doof made a cameo in the Hamster and Gretel episode "Strawberry Fest Forever".

Role in Phineas and Ferb
Doofenshmirtz in the show is a bumbling, dimwitted evil genius. His goal throughout most of the show is to take over the "entire tri-state area". He claims to be a doctor but actually purchased his doctorate online.

A typical episode features Doofenshmirtz hatching an evil scheme or invention that he often links to a "back story" from his youth in the fictional village of Gimmelshtump, Drusselstein. Drusselstein is loosely based on countries in Western-Central Europe like Germany and Austria, evidenced by buildings with Fachwerkhäuser architecture, the citizens speaking German in grammatical form or how the food, dresses and carnivals are similar to that of Fasching or even Oktoberfest. As a child, his parents were abusive and neglectful to him in many ways, including forcing him to be a lawn gnome, forcing him to dress as a girl, favouring his brother Roger over him, and failing to attend his birth. Doofenshmirtz monologues often and displays acts of "cartoonish" physical violence towards Perry the Platypus. Often his inventions achieve a single successful shot before being destroyed. This shot usually serves to get rid of Phineas and Ferb's invention for that episode, preventing their sister, Candace, from "busting" them by showing their creations to their mother. According to his own life story, he was a bratwurst salesman, before being ruined by the hot dog industry; only then did he become an evil scientist.

In Phineas and Ferb the Movie: Across the 2nd Dimension, a more intelligent and successful version of Dr. Doofenshmirtz (from an alternate reality) appears, with the regular Dr. Doofenshmirtz serving as a supporting character. The alternate Doofenshmirtz later returns in the episode sequel, Tales from the Resistance: Back to the 2nd Dimension.

Despite nearly failing in almost all of his schemes, there are a few times when Doofenshmirtz actually succeeds. One example is in the episode "Candace Disconnected", where he builds a Pick 'Em Up-Inator to successfully pick up his daughter from her school and bring her home in a couple of seconds. Another time is in the TV film, when he built an Otherdimension-Inator that involves traveling to alternate dimensions; this is done with help from Phineas and Ferb, much to Perry's distress. In the episode "Cranius Maximus", Doofenshmirtz builds a Key-Find-Inator to successfully steal the Key to the City, something which Perry failed to stop. Another example, which is perhaps the most famous, is in the 2014 special "Phineas and Ferb Save Summer", when Doofenshmirtz builds an -inator that uses the mass of the planet Jupiter to move the Earth away from the Sun into an early autumn. Despite being beaten by Perry with a mop, Doofenshmirtz manages to succeed in moving the Earth anyway, much to Perry's dismay. It also may have allowed him to briefly take over the Tri-State Area, as the change in weather caused civil unrest and allowed Doofenshmirtz and his fellow villains to take over City Hall.

In the series finale "Last Day of Summer", Doofenshmirtz built an -inator that involves building a Tri-Governor's Mansion to Danville so that he can be elected as the first Tri-Governor of the Tri-State Area. Through a series of time loops (caused by his Do-Over-Inator, which was activated by Candace), Doofenshmirtz anticipates Perry's every move and defeats him in a series of traps before proceeding with his scheme, which became a complete success. He even took the opportunity to write up a law forbidding Perry and his agents from thwarting him until his term is over, which left Perry very depressed and admitting defeat. Despite succeeding in his lifelong goal, Doofenshmirtz learns that Vanessa wants to have an internship at O.W.C.A. and that his job as Tri-Governor is preventing her from joining the internship, leaving her depressed as well. Deciding that her happiness is more important than his evil ways, Doofenshmirtz decides to give them up, change for the better and allow Vanessa to have the internship. Following this, Doofenshmirtz also becomes a member of O.W.C.A.

Role in Milo Murphy's Law
Dr. Doofenshmirtz makes a cameo appearance in the ending cliffhanger of the season finale of Milo Murphy's Law, and becomes a regular character throughout the second season. In the episode "The Phineas and Ferb Effect", he and the other characters had a mission to stop the Pistachions. After all turns back to normal, the Murphy's Law causes Doofenshmirtz's building to collapse, leaving Doofenshmirtz to become Milo's houseguest, living ever since in the shed in the Murphys' garden.

Leaving his evil days behind, he often tries to be a good guy, but usually causing trouble, mainly with his Inators. After "Sick Day", when he discovers that the O.W.C.A. paid Perry to watch over him, Doofenshmirtz felt hurt, saying occasionally that he is angry with him, and losing his relationship with Perry, he searches for a new adventure buddy, bonding with Dakota in "Look At This Ship" after he too lost his partner Cavendish, and investigating his disappearance together ever since.

Other spin-offs and crossovers
In January 2013, Disney launched the webseries Doof's Daily Dirt on YouTube. In it, the character comments on various Internet memes and pop culture trends, usually long after the subject is no longer of interest or relevance. Subjects have included Facebook, internet scronyms, Lolcatz, bacon-infused products, Psy's "Gangnam Style", One Direction, Carly Rae Jepsen's "Call Me Maybe", Honey Boo-Boo, the Kardashians and the Mayan apocalypse. The webisode series had an original run of 13 episodes and was renewed for a second season, but ultimately ended along with the end of the main series. Disney also started a Twitter account that posts frequently in the character's voice.

The character also appeared in the season finale for the reality TV series Shark Tank to "pitch his latest invention".

Creation and design

When Jeff "Swampy" Marsh and Dan Povenmire worked on the Nickelodeon animated series Rocko's Modern Life, they always included a song/musical number and an action/chase scene. They wanted to incorporate this trait in "Phineas and Ferb", and used a platypus secret agent, due to its interesting appearance  and role as a continuous nemesis that viewers could become familiar with. "Dr. Meddleshmirtz," which later changed to Doofenshmirtz, was created in the same vein.

Every main character of the series was designed using the geometric shapes of Tex Avery's Looney Tunes graphic style in mind - Doofenshmirtz appears to be an oval. The simplicity of the drawings were intended to allow child viewers to copy them easily. Each one was designed to be recognizable from a distance or, as Povenmire notes as a reference to Matt Groening and The Simpsons, by silhouette.

Voice
Co-creator and executive producer Dan Povenmire voices Doofenshmirtz. He describes the voice he uses as "Eastern European" and is one he used at the age of fifteen while having pillow fights with his five-year-old sister. To this day, his sister recognizes the voice and asks him to do it frequently. During recording sessions, Povenmire is easily able to ad-lib and improvise; the writers can change his lines without throwing him off. Povenmire sometimes even adds his own lines or alters his enunciation, and is usually asked to perform the voice in interviews.

Reception
Despite a negative review of Phineas and Ferb on Toon Zone, Maxie Zeus notes that Povenmire's performance as Doofenshmirtz is a strong point of the series. Zeus writes, "Dan Povenmire voices him with such energy, and with such perfect timing, that you'll laugh out loud even at the stuff that isn't even supposed to be funny." Zeus also says that the Doofenshmirtz subplot would have made a "fine bit of sketch writing" if trimmed down.

In 2009, Josh Jackson, editor-in-chief for Paste Magazine, wrote in a blog that Phineas and Ferb was "the best kids show on TV" and gave Doofenshmirtz a large amount of praise. Jackson calls his inventions "awesomely designated devices of pure evil" and his complex relationship with his nemesis Perry the Platypus as "pitch-perfect."

References
Episode references

Other sources

External links
 

Phineas and Ferb characters
Disney animated villains
Fictional Eastern European people
Fictional mad scientists
Fictional inventors
Fictional high school teachers
Fictional scientists in television
Fictional secret agents and spies
Fictional victims of domestic abuse
Television characters introduced in 2007
Animated characters introduced in 2007
Animated human characters
Villains in animated television series
Fictional immigrants to the United States
Male characters in animation
Milo Murphy's Law
Video game bosses